Seysulan is a village de facto in the Martakert Province of the breakaway Republic of Artsakh, de jure in the Tartar District of Azerbaijan, in the disputed region of Nagorno-Karabakh. The village is on the ceasefire line between the armed forces of Artsakh and Azerbaijan. The village had an ethnic Armenian-majority population in 1989.

History 
Seysulan was located in the Mardakert District of the Nagorno-Karabakh Autonomous Oblast (Azerbaijan SSR) during the Soviet period. In 1991 the Azerbaijani government dissolved the NKAO and placed Seysulan in the Tartar District. The village came under the control of ethnic Armenian forces during the First Nagorno-Karabakh War in the early 1990s.

Azerbaijan claimed to have attacked and retaken the village during clashes on 4 April 2016, but the Artsakh Defence Army disputed this claim as disinformation.

References

External links 
 

Populated places in Tartar District
Populated places in Martakert Province